Glomerellaceae is a monotypic family of fungi in the class Sordariomycetes that contains only one genus, Colletotrichum.

Genera 
Colletotrichum (sexual stage is Glomerella)

References

External links

Sordariomycetes
Fungus families